The Helen Dodge Three-Decker is an historic three-decker house at 570 Pleasant Street in Worcester, Massachusetts.  Built in 1912, the well preserved, architecturally eclectic building is representative of the final stages of three-decker development, and its penetration into the fashionable upper-class west side of the city.  The building was listed on the National Register of Historic Places in 1990.

Description and history
The Helen Dodge Three-Decker is located in a residential setting west of downtown Worcester, on the south side of Pleasant Street opposite the city's Newton Hill Park.  It is a three-story wood-frame structure, with a gable-on-hip roof and a mostly clapboarded exterior.  Prominent features of its front facade include an angled projecting rectangular bay on the left side, and a stack of three porches on the right. The porch is distinctive for its semi-circular arch openings, and there are bands of decoratively cut shingles between the floors.

The house was built about 1912, and was one of a number of more architecturally sophisticated three-deckers built on the city's fashionable west side, its middle-class working residents gaining access to the downtown via a streetcar line that ran down Pleasant Street.  Its early residents included clerks and telephone operators.

See also
National Register of Historic Places listings in northwestern Worcester, Massachusetts
National Register of Historic Places listings in Worcester County, Massachusetts

References

1912 establishments in Massachusetts
Apartment buildings on the National Register of Historic Places in Massachusetts
Houses completed in 1912
Apartment buildings in Worcester, Massachusetts
National Register of Historic Places in Worcester, Massachusetts
Queen Anne architecture in Massachusetts